The Bachelor Canada (season 1) is the first season of City reality television series The Bachelor Canada. The season premiered on October 3, 2012. This season features 28-year-old Brad Smith, a former Canadian Football League slotback from Hudson, Quebec.

Contestants
Biographical information according to City official series site, plus footnoted additions.

Future appearances

Bachelor in Paradise Canada 
Bianka Kamber returned to compete on the first season of Bachelor in Paradise Canada. She was eliminated week 3.

Call-out order

 The contestant received a first impression rose
 The contestant received a rose during the date
 The contestant was eliminated
 The contestant was eliminated during the date
 The contestant quit the competition
 The contestant won the competition

References

External links

2012 Canadian television seasons
The Bachelor (franchise) seasons
Television shows filmed in Ontario
Television shows filmed in Barbados